Tucetona multicostata is a species of clam.

References

Glycymerididae
Bivalves described in 1833